Hubrich is a surname. Notable people with the surname include:

Markus Hubrich (born 1963), New Zealand alpine skier
Mattias Hubrich (born 1966), New Zealand alpine skier

See also
Haubrich

German toponymic surnames